Polsat Biznes was a Polish-language business news TV channel. It was created in September 2004 as TV Biznes. The founder and owner TV Biznes was Professor Piotr Chomczyński and Piotr Barełkowski. Since February 8, 2007, the owner of TV Biznes is Polsat Group. On February 18, 2013, TV Biznes was renamed Polsat Biznes.

Polsat Biznes broadcast of a news and current affairs, stock quotes, business magazines, documentary and lifestyle programs. The station was closed in 2014.

TVN CNBC was a competitor from September 2007 to December 2013.

External links
 Official site

Polsat
Defunct television channels in Poland
Television channels and stations established in 2004
Television channels and stations disestablished in 2014